The 1975–76 Segunda División season saw 20 teams participate in the second flight Spanish league. Burgos, Celta de Vigo and CD Málaga were promoted to Primera División. Real Murcia, CD Ensidesa, CA Osasuna and Gimnàstic de Tarragona were relegated to Tercera División.

Teams

Final table

Results

Relegation playoff

Pichichi Trophy for top goalscorers

External links 
  Official LFP Site

Segunda División seasons
2
Spain